Sung Yu-ri (born March 3, 1981) is a South Korean actress and singer. She made her entertainment debut in 1998 as a member of the now-defunct K-pop group Fin.K.L. Sung turned to acting in 2002, starring in television dramas such as Thousand Years of Love (2003), The Snow Queen (2006), Hong Gil-dong (2008), and Feast of the Gods (2010).

Early life and education
Sung was born in 1981 in Tübingen, Baden-Württemberg, West Germany. Her father Sung Jong-hyun, a prominent professor of theology at the Presbyterian College and Theological Seminary, was studying at the time in West Germany. Sung's family returned to South Korea when she was four years old and she grew up in Gangdong District, Seoul. She attended Myung Elementary and Middle School, and Kwang Nam High School, and graduated from Kyung Hee University with a Post Modern Music major in 2005.

Career
When Sung was a high school student, she began her entertainment career in 1998 as the youngest member of the four-member K-pop girl group Fin.K.L (which stood for "Fine Killing Liberty"), one of the first Korean idol groups. Fin.K.L quickly rose in popularity, releasing four albums (Blue Rain (1998), White (1999), Now (2001), Eternity (2002)), and various singles, live concert albums and compilation albums. But after the release of their fourth album, Sung and fellow band members Ock Joo-hyun, Lee Hyori and Lee Jin began doing solo activities.

Sung made her acting debut in 2002 with Bad Girls, and a year later was cast in her first leading role in Thousand Years of Love (2003). Sung learned horseback riding and martial arts in her role as a Baekje princess who time travels to modern-day South Korea. This was followed by the romantic comedy First Love of a Royal Prince (2004), partly shot in Japan and Bali, in which Sung's fun-loving sandwich shop delivery girl was a departure from her previous feminine characters. During this time, she was harshly criticized for her acting.

Sung graduated from Kyung Hee University in February 2005 with a degree in Theater and Film; she also received an Achievement Award for promoting her alma mater. After a brief return to music via Fin.K.L's digital single Corealism in late 2005, she decided to focus solely on her acting career. In line with this, all the Fin.K.L members left their agency DSP Entertainment, and Sung joined SidusHQ in June 2005. In 2006, she starred in One Fine Day and The Snow Queen, playing, respectively, an orphan adopted by a wealthy but suffocating family, and a cold-hearted heiress with an incurable disease.

But it was fusion-period dramedy Hong Gil-dong in 2008 that changed how the industry perceived Sung as an actress. The series' screenwriters, the Hong sisters were initially criticized for casting her, but they defended Sung, and her portrayal of a tomboyish, vanity-free outlaw drew a positive reception from audiences.

Sung then played an aspiring show director who joins the Cirque du Soleil in Swallow the Sun, a 2009 big-budget action-romance series with overseas location shoots in Las Vegas and South Africa. That same year, she also appeared in her first big-screen starring role as a Korean-American adoptee who returns to her native country to search for her biological mother in Maybe (titled Rabbit and Lizard in Korean).

In 2011, Sung left SidusHQ and transferred to King Kong Entertainment. She then starred in Romance Town, in the role of a maid who wins  in the lottery and keeps it a secret from her boss and fellow household help. A more traditional melodrama followed with Feast of the Gods (2012), about two rival female chefs of Korean royal court cuisine. Afterwards, Sung reunited onscreen with previous Hong Gil-dong co-star Kang Ji-hwan in the action-comedy film Runway Cop, which revolves around a detective who goes undercover as a fashion model for a drug case.

In 2013, she played a genius with psychogenic amnesia in The Secret of Birth. The low-budget indie A Boy's Sister was then released, in which Sung played the titular character who's grieving after her brother's death. Later that year, she replaced Han Hye-jin as one of the hosts of talk show Healing Camp, Aren't You Happy.

When Sung's contract with King Kong Entertainment expired in January 2014, she signed with Fantagio. She then appeared for free in the short film Chorogi and the Stalker Guy which screened at 6th Seoul International Extreme-Short Image & Film Festival (SESIFF). Sung next played a diva actress who unexpectedly falls for her loyal manager in the 2015 omnibus Summer Snow.

On April 20, 2015, Sung signed an exclusive contract with SL Entertainment. She next starred in the revenge melodrama Monster.

Personal life 
Sung married golfer Ahn Sung-hyun in May 2017 in a low-key private ceremony. They had been dating for four years and did not publicly announce their marriage until after the ceremony. On July 16, 2021, Sung announced on her Instagram that she was pregnant with twins. Later on January 8, 2022, Sung's agency announced that Sung had given birth to twin daughters on January 7, 2022.

Philanthropy 
On July 22, 2022, Sung purchased cosmetics worth 30 million won with her own money, which were donated to the Skylight Project.

Filmography

Video game appearances 
Sung Yu-ri is a playable character in the video game Tony Hawk's Pro Skater 2 (only in the South Korean PC version).

Discography

Fin.K.L

Solo artist

Awards and nominations

Notes

References

External links 
  
 
 
 

1981 births
Fin.K.L members
Living people
Kyung Hee University alumni
South Korean female idols
South Korean television actresses
South Korean film actresses
South Korean women pop singers
South Korean Presbyterians
IHQ (company) artists
DSP Media artists
King Kong by Starship artists
21st-century South Korean singers
21st-century South Korean women singers